The Men's 62 kg weightlifting event at the 2007 Pan American Games took place at the Complexo Esportivo Riocentro on 14 July  2007.

Schedule
All times are Brasilia Time (UTC-3)

Records
Prior to this competition, the existing world, Pan American and Games records were as follows:

Results

References

Weightlifting at the 2007 Pan American Games